Loricariichthys derbyi, commonly known as Cari, is a species of catfish in the family Loricariidae. It is endemic to Brazil, where it occurs in the Jaguaribe River basin. The species reaches  in total length, can weigh up to at least , and is believed to be a facultative air-breather.

References 

Loricariini
Fish described in 1915
Endemic fauna of Brazil